This is a list of cricket players who have played representative cricket for North Central Province in Sri Lanka. North Central Province cricket team was founded in 2004.

It includes players that have played at least one match, in senior First-Class, List A cricket, or Twenty20 matches. Practice matches are not included, unless they have officially been classified at First-class tour matches.

The Inter-Provincial Cricket Tournament is the premier domestic cricket competition in Sri Lanka. It was founded in 1990.

First Class Players
All of the cricket players who have represented Ruhuna in first class cricket in order of their appearance for the team:

List 'A' Players
North Central Province is yet to play any List A matches.

Twenty20 Players
North Central Province is yet to play any Twenty20 matches.

External links
Players Who Have Played For North Central Province
Sri Lanka Cricket

North Central Province cricketers
North Central Province